Adams Fall is writer Sean Desmond's first novel. It recounts the events which occur to a college student in his senior year at Harvard University. In the midst of completing his thesis and applying for a study abroad program, the narrator copes with his stresses by resorting to alcohol and other drugs.

Adams House, a real House at Harvard, features prominently in the novel; the author is himself a Harvard graduate.

The novel was the (loose) basis for the 2002 film Abandon starring Katie Holmes.

References

2000 American novels
Novels set in Harvard University
American novels adapted into films
American thriller novels
2000 debut novels